The 2004 PlaceMakers V8 International was a motor race for V8 Supercars held on the weekend of 2 - 4 April 2004. The event was held at the Pukekohe Park Raceway in Pukekohe, New Zealand, and consisted of three races culminating in 300 kilometers. It was the third round of thirteen in the 2004 V8 Supercar Championship Series and the only international event on the calendar.

Results

Qualifying

Top Ten Shootout

Race 1

Race 2

Race 3

References

Pukekohe
Motorsport in New Zealand
2004 in New Zealand motorsport